Lewis C. Carpenter (1836–1908) was a U.S. Representative from South Carolina.

Lewis Carpenter may also refer to:

Lew Carpenter
Lew Carpenter (baseball)

See also
Louis Carpenter (disambiguation)